In enzymology, a lombricine kinase is an enzyme that catalyzes the chemical reaction

ATP + lombricine  ADP + N-phospholombricine

The two substrates of this enzyme are ATP and lombricine, and the two products are ADP and N-phospholombricine.

This enzyme belongs to the family of transferases, specifically those transferring phosphorus-containing groups (phosphotransferases) with a nitrogenous group as acceptor.  The systematic name of this enzyme class is ATP:lombricine N-phosphotransferase. This enzyme participates in glycine, serine and threonine metabolism.

References

 
 
 
 

EC 2.7.3
Enzymes of unknown structure